Clausicella is a genus of bristle flies in the family Tachinidae.

Species
, there are seventeen species accepted within Clausicella.
 Clausicella aurantiaca (Mesnil, 1973)
 Clausicella diluta (van der Wulp, 1890) 
 Clausicella floridensis (Townsend, 1892)
 Clausicella geniculata (Townsend, 1892)
 Clausicella melitarae (Reinhard, 1946)
 Clausicella molitor (Wiedemann, 1824)
 Clausicella neomexicana (Townsend, 1892)
 Clausicella opaca (Coquillett, 1895)
 Clausicella politura (Reinhard, 1946)
 Clausicella setigera (Coquillett, 1895)
 Clausicella solennis Richter, 1999
 Clausicella suturata Rondani, 1856
 Clausicella townsendi (Curran, 1931)
 Clausicella triangulifera Mesnil, 1963
 Clausicella turmalis (Reinhard, 1946)
 Clausicella xanthocera (Richter, 1972)

References

Further reading

External links

 

Tachininae
Taxa named by Camillo Rondani